Coenonympha california is a species of butterfly native to North America. Its status as a species is currently in dispute.

Taxonomy 
Coenonympha california contains the following subspecies:

 Coenonympha california mcisaaci
 Coenonympha california galactinus
 Coenonympha california benjamini
 Coenonympha california mackenziei
 Coenonympha california yontocket
 Coenonympha california eryngii
 Coenonympha california eunomia
 Coenonympha california columbiana
 Coenonympha california mono
 Coenonympha california elko
 Coenonympha california pseudobrenda
 Coenonympha california subfusca
 Coenonympha california furcae
 Coenonympha california nipisiquit
 Coenonympha california ampelos
 Coenonympha california ochracea
 Coenonympha california insulana
 Coenonympha california inornata
 Coenonympha california california

References 

california